The Dala Line is a single-track railway line in Sweden, linking the city of Uppsala to the towns of Sala, Avesta-Krylbo, Hedemora, Säter, Borlänge and Mora. In Uppsala, the line joins the East Coast Line, which goes south to Stockholm. In Borlänge, the Bergslagen Line connects to Falun–Gävle.

Railway lines in Sweden